Athemistus rugulosus is a species of beetle in the family Cerambycidae. It was described by Félix Édouard Guérin-Méneville in 1831. It is known from Australia.

References

Athemistus
Beetles described in 1831